This is a list, which includes photographic galleries, of some of the remaining historic structures and monuments, of historic significance, in Phoenix, Arizona, United States. Included are photographs of properties identified by the African, Asian and Hispanic historic property surveys of the City of Phoenix, focusing on the themes of history in Phoenix from 1870 to 1975.

This list however, is not limited to historical structures and monuments. Also listed are historical landmarks, some of which are listed in the National Register of Historic Places such as the Pueblo Grande Ruin and Irrigation Sites and the Deer Valley Rock Art Center. These contain the ruins of structures and artifacts of the Hohokams who lived within the modern Phoenix city area before the arrival of the settlers of non-Native American origin.

The abandoned Joint Head Dam and the early canals built by the early pioneers of European descent played an important role in the irrigation and development of Phoenix and its surrounding areas. Pictured is the ruins of the abandoned Joint Head Dam built in 1884. Also, pictured is the Grand Canal, the oldest canal in Phoenix which was built by the pioneers in 1877, and the Old Crosscut Canal, built in 1888.

Included in this list are the photographs of the final resting place of various notable people who are interred in Phoenix's historic cemeteries who were of historical importance to Phoenix and Arizona. According to the definition by the "Pioneers' Cemetery Association (PCA)" a "historic cemetery" is one which has been in existence for more than fifty years. Among the cemeteries listed is the abandoned Crosscut Cemetery which was established in 1870 and therefore, Phoenix's oldest cemetery and the Pioneer and Military Memorial Park, which is listed in the National Register of Historic Places.

Listed are some museums in Phoenix with the images of artifacts of historical importance. Such is the case of the Phoenix Trolley Museum where the historic Trolley Car #116 is showcased. Among the museums are the Martin Auto Museum, which showcases automobiles from 1886 onward and the Musical Instrument Museum.

Laveen and the Sunnyslope District are listed separately because these were two areas whose citizens wanted to proclaim the areas as independent towns, but whose areas were instead merged into the city of Phoenix.

Phoenix

Phoenix is the capital, and largest city, of the U.S. state of Arizona. Phoenix was incorporated as a city in 1881, after being founded in 1867 near the Salt River close to its confluence with the Gila River. The city has numerous historic properties which have been listed in the National Register of Historic Places. There are also 33 landmarks and attractions within Phoenix that are claimed to represent the best features of the city. These have been designated as "Phoenix Points of Pride" and/or are listed in the Phoenix Historic Property Register.  The Phoenix Historic Property Register, was established in 1986. It is the city's official listing of the historic and prehistoric properties that have been deemed worthy of preservation. Some of these properties are listed in both the National Register of Historic Places and in the Phoenix Historic Property Register.

Historic Heritage Square is part of the Heritage and Science Park on the east end of downtown. It encompasses the only remaining group of residential structures from the original town site of Phoenix. The images of these properties with a short description of the same are included.

Vanishing Phoenix

According to Robert A. Melikian, author of the book "Vanishing Phoenix", Phoenix's preservation office does not have the ability to deny a demolition permit. Therefore, the owner of a property, listed either in the National Register of Historic Places or the Phoenix Historic Property Register, may demolish the historical property. Entire neighborhoods, such as Golden Gate, where members of the minority communities lived have been razed. Both the residence of former Territorial Governor Joseph Kibbey located at 1334 E. Jefferson St. which served as the home and medical practice of Dr. Winston C. Hackett, the first African-American physician in Arizona and the building located at 1342 E. Jefferson St. where Hackett founded the Booker T. Washington Memorial Hospital were demolished. The historic St. James Hotel is an example of a building listed in the National Register of Historic Places which will be demolished, despite the protests of preservation groups, to make way for a VIP parking lot for the Phoenix Suns season ticket holders. Among the properties which are listed in the National Register of Historic Places and which have been demolished are the following:

 Arizona Citrus Growers Association Warehouse-601 E. Jackson St.
 Concrete Block House – 618-620 N. 4th Ave.
 Higuera Grocery – 923 S. 2nd Ave.
 Lightning Delivery Co. Warehouse-425 E. Jackson St.
 Overland Arizona Co. – 12 N. 4th Ave.
 Judge W. H. Stillwell House – 2039 W. Monroe St.
 Clinton Campbell House – 361 N. 4th Ave.

Some of the historic houses and buildings which are listed in the National Register of Historic Places and/ or the Phoenix Historic Property Register are also listed in the "enDangered Dozen Historic Places List," released by the Phoenix Historic Neighborhoods Coalition. These structures are prone to vandalism and the elements. Among the structures which are neglected and are at the highest risk of disappearing in the near future are the following:

 The Steinegger Lodge, built in 1889 and located at 27 E. Monroe St.
 The William R. Norton House, built in 1895 and located at 2222 W. Washington St.
 The Charles Pugh House, built in 1897 and located at 356 N. Second Ave./ 362 N. Second Ave. (The 356 address is how the records show the house today. It was listed as 362 in older records.)
 The Louis Emerson House, built in 1902 and located at 623 N. Fourth St.
 The Concrete Block Bungalow, built in 1908 and located at 606 N. 9th St.
 The Leighton G. Knipe House, built in 1909 and located at 1025 N. 2nd Ave.
 The Sach's-Webster Farmstead House, built in 1909 and located in the Northwest corner of 75th Ave. and Baseline.
 The Sarah Pemberton House, built in 1920 and located at 1121 N. 2nd St.
 Mrs. Neal House, built in 1920 and located at 102 East Willetta Street.

Pueblo Grande Ruin
The Pueblo Grande Ruin is the remains of a 450 BC prehistoric Hohokam village. For unknown reasons the site was abandoned by 1450 AD. These are some of the ruins of the Hohokam structures which were unearthed and which are situated in the Pueblo Grande Museum & Archaeological Park.

The Joint Head Dam and canals
When the pioneers of European descent settled in Phoenix, the area was mainly desert. Settlers such as Jack Swilling were inspired by the ancient canals of the Hohokam. The pioneers soon began to dig ditches to carry water from the Salt River which would irrigate their farms. Eventually, canal building companies, such as the Arizona Canal Company, which was formed in December 1882, were organized and built the current canals in the area. The Joint Head Dam was built in 1884, where Jack Swilling dug his ditch, known as the "Swillings Ditch", and where the Salt River are located. The dam served the Grand Canal (built 1878) and eventually the Old Crosscut Canal (built 1888). The abandoned Joint Head Dam has been determined to be eligible for inclusion in the National Register of Historic Places under criterion "A" because of its association with the locally important history of reclamation and therefore, is a Section 4 (f) resource.

Heritage Square
Phoenix's Heritage Square is located in what once was block 14 of the original townsite of Phoenix. The square dates back to the Victorian era of the late 1800s. The townsite was listed in the National Register of Historic Places on November 7, 1978, reference: #78000550. The Dr. Roland Lee Rosson House (1895), now a Victorian-period historic house museum, and Baird Machine Shop (1920), which are individually listed in the National Register of Historic Places, are also located in the historic square.

Buildings and structures
This section includes historical buildings which are listed either in the National Register of Historic Places or in the Phoenix Historic Property Register. The oldest of these, which is still standing and in use, is the "Fry's Building" which was built in 1885. The oldest hotel, which was completed in 1893, and is still in use today is the "Windsor Hotel".

Also, included in this section are historic structures such as the "Heard Ranch Grain Silos", listed in the PHPR plus, the Arizona State Fair Grandstand which was built in the early 1900s, the "17th Avenue Underpass" and the "Central Avenue Underpass", both which are eligible to be included in the National Register of Historic Places.

Houses of religious worship
Many of the historic houses of religious worship, such as the "First Presbyterian Church" (1892),  are listed in the National Register of Historic Places. Others, such as the "Tanner Chapel A.M.E. Church" (1929), have been designated historic by the Phoenix Historic Property Register. The Tanner Chapel A.M.E. Church, one of the oldest African-American churches in the state, is the only Arizona church where civil rights leader Martin Luther King Jr. is known to have given a sermon. Houses of religious worship such as the "First Mexican Baptist Church" (1920), Phoenix's oldest Hispanic church, are recognized as historic by surveys as is the case of the Hispanic American Historic Property Survey of the City of Phoenix.

Educational institutions
The first school in Phoenix was established in 1873. It was known as the Little Adobe School and it was located in 202 N. Central Ave. where the San Carlos Hotel currently stands. Schools were segregated then and therefore, so were many of the historic schools on this list. The Phoenix Indian School was established in 1891 under the federal "assimilation" policy which sought to regimentalize and culturally exterminate Native American students. African-American students were only allowed to attend racially segregated schools such as the Dunbar School which was built in 1925, the Phoenix Union Colored High School (Later renamed George Washington Carver High School) built in 1926, and the Booker T. Washington Elementary School built in 1928.

19th century historic houses
Some of these houses meet the National Register criteria for evaluation. The quality of significance in American history, architecture, archeology, engineering, and culture is present in districts, sites, buildings, structures, and objects that possess integrity of location, design, setting, materials, workmanship, feeling, and association and that are associated with the lives of persons significant in Phoenix's past. The following prominent people who at one time or another lived in Phoenix and whose houses are listed here are:

 Clinton Campbell, a locally prominent builder who worked in Phoenix. His house however, was demolished in 2017.
 Phillip "Lord" Darrell Duppa. Duppa is credited with naming "Phoenix" and "Tempe" and the founding of the town of New River.
 Burgess A. Hadsell, Hadsell, together with William J. Murphy, promoted the temperance colony of Glendale, Arizona in the western Salt River Valley.
 William John Murphy. Murphy created the Arizona Improvement Company in 1887 and bought land in areas that would eventually become the towns of Peoria and Glendale of Arizona.
 William R. Norton. Norton founded the Sunnyslope subdivision of Phoenix and designed the Carnegie Library, the city's first library, and the Gila County Courthouse in Globe, Arizona.
 William Osborn, one of Phoenix's first homesteaders.
 Judge Charles A. Tweed. Judge Tweed was appointed an Associate Justice to the Arizona Territorial Supreme Court. Tweed then moved to Arizona Territory and was appointed to serve two terms as an Associate Justice of the Arizona Territorial Supreme Court.

20th century historic houses
The following prominent people who at one time or another lived in Phoenix and whose houses are listed here are:

 Dr. Charles "Charley" Borah, an American athlete, who won the gold medal in the 4 × 100 m relay at the 1928 Summer Olympics.
 Jorgine Slettede Boomer, the widow of Lucius Boomer, a successful hotelier. Her house was designed by Frank Lloyd Wright.
 Dr. George Brockway, a physician who served as the Pinal County Superintendent of Public Health as well as two terms as Mayor of Florence.
 L. Ron Hubbard, the founder of the Church of Scientology religion.
 John McCain, a statesman who served as a United States Senator from Arizona from January 1987 until his death. He previously served two terms in the United States House of Representatives and was the Republican nominee for President of the United States in the 2008 election.
 Colonel James McClintock, whose full name was "James Henry McClintock", was a veteran of the United States Army who served in the Spanish–American War. He moved to Arizona and served as state historian from 1917 through 1922. He was also one of the founders of the Arizona Republican newspaper, now The Arizona Republic.
 Dr. James C. Norton, the territorial veterinarian.
 Wing F. Ong, the first person born in China to be elected to a state legislative house.
 Henry E. Pierce, who served as County Assessor during the 1920s and was secretary to Governor John C. Phillips from 1929 until 1932. He was chairperson of the Maricopa County Republican Central Committee. In addition to his political activities, Pierce was a partner in the real estate firm of Jacobs & Pierce.
 Aubrey and Winstona Aldridge. Winstona Hackett was the daughter of Dr. Winston Hackett the first African-American doctor in the area, and her husband Aubrey Aldridge.
 William Wrigley, Jr., the Chewing-gum magnate whose mansion in Phoenix is known by some people as "La Colina Solana".

Historic African, Asian and Hispanic properties

The City of Phoenix conducted various historic property surveys focusing on the themes of African, Asian and Hispanic history in Phoenix from 1870 to 1975. The purpose of the surveys was to identify the number and locations of minority associated historic properties citywide and to document their significance to their community. The surveys were funded by the Phoenix Historic Preservation Bonds funds as well as a Certified Local Government grant received from the National Park Service through the Arizona State Historic Preservation Office. While the National Register of Historic Places Criteria is only concentrated on the properties of these communities prior to 1955, the study included in the surveys take into consideration the significance of the struggle for civil rights and equality. Therefore, the properties which were involved in ending segregation in Phoenix are also included.

The areas covered in the African American Historic Property Survey are 1. East – the region south of Van Buren Ave.to the Southern Pacific Railroad tracks, east of Central Avenue to 24th Street; 2. West – the region south of Grant Ave. to the Salt River, west of 7th Avenue to 19th Avenue; and 3. South – the region south of the Salt River to Southern Ave., east of 16th Street to 28th Street.

The areas covered in the Asian American Historic Property Survey are spread throughout Phoenix and not concentrated in one area.  The concentration of the areas depends on the nationality from which they are descended, such as Chinese, Japanese, Filipino and Asian Indian.

The areas covered in the Hispanic American Historic Property Survey are the regions south of the Southern Pacific Railroad tracks to the Salt River, east of Central Avenue to 24th Street; west of Central Avenue to 27th Avenue and south of the Salt River to Baseline, east to 48th Street and west to 35th Avenue. One of the structures considered as iconic is the Sacred Heart Church which is located in 920 S. 17th St.. The church was built in 1900 in what was once a Hispanic neighborhood called "Golden Gate". The City of Phoenix forced the residents of the community in question to move and demolished the entire neighborhood. The reason given for this act was that the city needed the land to expand Sky Harbor Airport. The church was added to National Register of Historic Places on March 20, 2012. Reference number 12000124.

The following prominent people who at one time or another lived in Phoenix and whose houses are listed here are:

 Judge Hazel Burton Daniels – Daniels was the first African American elected to the Arizona legislature and was the first African-American municipal judge in Phoenix, serving as such from 1965 to 1971.
 Dr. Lincoln Johnson Ragsdale Sr. and Eleanor D. Ragsdale – The Ragsdales were influential leader in the Phoenix Civil Rights Movement. They played an instrumental role in the reforms made of voting rights and the desegregation of schools, neighborhoods and public housing.
 Charles Smith – Smith was the only African-American blacksmith in Phoenix in the early 1920s.
 John Ford Smith – Smith is the only Arizonan known to have played in the national Negro Baseball Leagues. In 1941 Smith joined the Kansas City Monarchs, a team that won its third straight pennant in the Negro American League that year. Smith worked for Phoenix Union High School, served as director of Eastlake Park, and eventually became assistant vice president of human resources at the Arizona Bank. He was active in civil rights issues and served as director of the Arizona Civil Rights Commission.
 Travis L. Williams – Williams was one of the founders of Williams and Jones Construction Company which built homes primarily in South Phoenix. From 1964 to 1989 he worked for the City of Phoenix where he retired as the head of the Human Resources Department. He was a member of several service and civic organizations including the NAACP and Southminster Presbyterian Church.

 Dea Hong Toy – Toy was born in China and moved to Phoenix in 1923. He was a successful merchant. Toy was among those in the Asian community of Phoenix who in 1938 founded the Chinese Chamber of Commerce to protect and promote their businesses.
 Wing F. Ong – Ong lived in a house in the rear of his grocery store which is listed here. He ran for the state House of Representatives as a Democrat in 1946 and was elected, the first Chinese American in the country to achieve such status. Over the course of his career, he was elected twice to the state House and once to the state Senate.
 Lee Jew – Jew was a Chinese merchant who owned the "Lee Jew Market" on E. Jefferson St.. He was influential as a leader in the Phoenix Chinese community.

 Vincente Canalez – In 1945 Canalez was selected to serve as Maricopa County chairman to fight infantile paralysis, and served on the City of Phoenix's planning commission in the 1950s. He moved to the Arizona town of Buckeye in 1957, and served as mayor of Buckeye in 1960.
 Valdemar Aguirre Cordova – Cordova served as the first Mexican American Maricopa County Superior Court judge, from 1965 to 1967, and then appointed to a second term in 1976 by Governor Raul Castro.
 Jesus Franco – The Spanish-language newspaper, El Sol, emerged in 1938 under the leadership of Jesús Franco, who became a very well-known individual in the Mexican community.
 Albert and Mary Garcia – Albert Garcia was Arizona's first Hispanic Assistant Attorney General. María García was an activist for social issues.
 Placida Garcia Smith – Placida Garcia Smith founded the "Friendly House" in the mid-1920s as a two-room "community house" where classes in English, citizenship, hygiene and homemaking were taught to Mexican residents.
 Rudolf Zepeda  – Zepeda was the first Hispanic official at Valley National Bank in the 1950s, serving as the vice-president for foreign trade.
 Adam Perez Diaz – In 1954, Diaz became the first Hispanic elected to the Phoenix City Council and also served as Vice-Mayor. President Bill Clinton appointed Diaz to the National Council on Aging

Arizona Biltmore Hotel

Arizona State Capitol Museum

Bennitt Mansion

Mystery Castle

Scorpion Gulch

Squaw Peak Inn

Westward Ho Hotel

Wrigley Mansion

Central Avenue Corridor
The north and south sides of the Central Avenue Corridor of Phoenix are lined with historical houses and buildings. These are the images of those properties. Some are listed in the National Register of Historic Places and some are listed in the Phoenix Historic Properties Register. There are also some historic properties which are listed in both registers.

Cemeteries
The Pioneers' Cemetery Association (PCA) defines an "historic cemetery" as one which has been in existence for more than fifty years. There are various historic cemeteries which were established in the late 19th century. These cemeteries serve as the final resting place of various notable citizens of Arizona. Among which can be found pioneers, governors, congressman, government officials, journalists, race car drivers, soldiers, actors and actresses.

The four historic cemeteries listed are:

  Crosscut Cemetery sometimes referred to the Williams Crosscut Cemetery – Established in 1870.
 Pioneer and Military Memorial Park – Seven historic cemeteries founded in 1884.
 St. Francis Catholic Cemetery – Established in 1897
 Greenwood/Memory Lawn Mortuary & Cemetery – Established in 1906.

Crosscut Cemetery
The Crosscut Cemetery, a.k.a. the Williams Crosscut Cemetery, was established in 1870 by John Wesley and Amanda "Manda" Williams. The historic cemetery, which at the time was located in the desert far from central Phoenix, is the oldest pioneer cemetery in Phoenix. It is located in what is now the corner of 48th St. and East. Van Buren St. Many of the headstones are missing and some of the graves vandalized. The cemetery, which continues to belong to the Williams family, has a locked gate and a chained-linked fence with barbered wire surrounding it.

Pioneer and Military Memorial Park
The Pioneer and Military Memorial Park is the official name given to seven historic cemeteries in Phoenix, Arizona. The cemeteries were founded in 1884 in what was known as "Block 32". On February 1, 2007, "Block 32" was renamed Pioneer and Military Memorial Park.

St. Francis Catholic Cemetery
St. Francis Catholic Cemetery, established in 1897, is one of the oldest in the city. Its inhabitants represent pioneer families, community and business leaders, miners, those who succumbed to tuberculosis, and others who helped write the history of Phoenix and Arizona. Margaret Geare of Dublin, Ireland, who was buried on October 12, 1897, is believed to be the first to be buried in the cemetery. The cemetery is located at 2033 N. 48th Street.

Greenwood/Memory Lawn Mortuary & Cemetery
Greenwood/Memory Lawn Mortuary & Cemetery is the final resting place of various notable people. Among them are three Arizona Territory Governors, six Arizona State Governors, a Secretary of Arizona Territory, the founder of Glendale, Arizona, the 1958 Indianapolis 500 winner and a journalist.

Historic structures related to "The Trunk Murderess"

Winnie Ruth Judd was a native of Indiana who worked in Phoenix as a medical secretary. Judd was accused of murdering and dismembering the bodies of her two roommates, friends Agnes Anne LeRoi and Hedvig Samuelson. The prosecutors in her trial alleged that she placed the dismembered parts of the bodies in two trunks (suitcases) and took them to Los Angeles. According to prosecutors, the murders were committed by Judd and an accomplice, Phoenix businessman John "Happy Jack" Halloran, whom she claimed was her lover. Her trial was marked by sensationalized nationwide newspaper coverage, who referred to Judd as "The Trunk Murderess". She was pronounced guilty and sentenced to death by hanging. The sentence she received raised debate about capital punishment. Days before her execution Winnie Ruth was called back to the courtroom for an insanity hearing. In 1933, she was found to be insane and moved from prison to the Arizona State Mental Hospital.

The historic properties pictured are all either directly or indirectly related to Judd and the infamous crime. Three of the buildings are listed in the National Register of Historic Places, two of the houses are located in the Historic Roosevelt District which is listed in the National Register of Historic Places and the house where the murders took place was once listed in the "enDangered Dozen Historic Places List," released by the Phoenix Historic Neighborhoods Coalition. It is now in the process of restoration and will be used to house a law firm.

Landmarks
Among the landmarks that are pictured and included in this article are the Deer Valley Rock Art Center and Papago Park. The Deer Valley Rock Art Center, also known as the Hedgpeth Hills Petroglyph Site and the Sonoran Desert preserve, is a 47-acre archaeological site containing over 1500 Hohokam, Patayan, and Archaic petroglyphs. The petroglyphs are between 500 and 7,000 years old, and at least one source dates the petroglyphs to 10,000 years ago. The site was listed on the National Register of Historic Places in 1984, and it was also listed with the Phoenix Points of Pride.
A museum designed by Will Bruder was constructed on the site in 1994.

Papago Park is a hilly desert park covering 1200 acres in its Phoenix extent and 296 acres in its Tempe extent. It is where the Desert Botanical Garden, the Phoenix Zoo, and Hunt's Tomb, the pyramidal tomb of Arizona's first governor, George W. P. Hunt are located.

Deer Valley Rock Art Center(Hedgpeth Hills Petroglyph Site)

Papago Park
The Desert Botanical Garden, Hole-in-the-Rock and Hunt's tomb are located in Papago Park. Papago Park was listed in the Phoenix Historic Property Register in October 1989. The Desert Botanical Garden is designated as a Phoenix Point of Pride. The Webster Auditorium is listed in the National Register of Historic Places.

Museums
A museum is a building or place where objects of historical, artistic, or scientific interest are exhibited, preserved, or studied. There are many museums in Phoenix, among them the Heard Museum, an Art Museum which serves as a showcase for Native American culture and the Phoenix Art Museum, an Art Museum, which showcases artwork from the Renaissance to today.

This section of the list includes the Pioneer Living History Museum and the Phoenix Trolley Museum. The Pioneer Living History Museum has 30 historic original and reconstructed buildings from the 1880s and early 1900s on its 90-acre property. The main exhibit of the Phoenix Trolley Museum is the historic trolley car #116, a restored 1928 trolley which served the original Phoenix trolley system.

This section also includes some images of cars exhibited in the Martin Auto Museum and some of the historic musical instruments on exhibit in the Musical Instrument Museum. The Martin Auto Museum is dedicated to the preservation of historical and collectible automobiles for educational purposes and the Musical Instrument Museum, which bills itself as "The World’s Only Global Musical Instrument Museum", displays more than 6,500 instruments collected from around 200 of the world's countries and territories. Among the exhibits is the Steinway piano that John Lennon used to compose the song "Imagine", Elvis Presley's guitar, a 1900 Cuatro, and displays dedicated to various countries.

Pioneer Living History Museum

Phoenix Trolley Museum

Martin Auto Museum

Musical Instrument Museum

Laveen
Laveen, an urban village within the city of Phoenix, which was first settled by farmers and dairymen in 1884. In the early 1900s, Walter E. Laveen and his family homesteaded an area encompassing all four corners of present-day 51st Avenue and Dobbins Road, where they also built the area's first general storethe Laveen Storeon the southeast corner. Two properties in Laveen are listed in the National Register of Historic Places.

Sunnyslope District
The Sunnyslope community is a long-established cohesive neighborhood within the borders of the city of Phoenix.  It has its own "small town" identity and a sense of place that is a point of pride embraced by community members. Sunnyslope has attempted to be incorporated as its own town on four occasions but failed every time. In 1959 the City of Phoenix annexed the community of Sunnyslope. Most of the structures of historic significance have been razed.

Miscellaneous

See also

 National Register of Historic Places listings in Phoenix, Arizona
 Phoenix Historic Property Register
 Pioneer and Military Memorial Park
 USS Arizona salvaged artifacts
 National Register of Historic Places listings in Maricopa County, Arizona
 Martin Auto Museum
Historic structures in Phoenix with articles
 Smurthwaite House
 El Cid Castle
 Windsor Hotel
 Squaw Peak Inn

References

Further reading
 Vanishing Phoenix; by Robert A. Melikian; Publisher: Arcadia Publishing; .
 Phoenix Then and Now; by: Paul Scharbach and John H. Akers; Publisher: Thunder Bay Press; 
 Sunnyslope (Images of America); by Reba Wells Grandrud; Publisher: Arcadia Publishing (July 29, 2013); 
 Midcentury Marvels: Commercial Architecture of Phoenix, 1945–1975; by: City of Phoenix Historic Preservation and Ryden Architects; Publisher: City of Phoenix; 

Buildings and structures in Phoenix, Arizona
Phoenix
Cemeteries in Arizona
Culture of Phoenix, Arizona
History of Phoenix, Arizona